Manatuto, officially Manatuto Administrative Post, is an administrative post (and was formerly a subdistrict) in Manatuto municipality, East Timor. Its seat or administrative centre is the suco of Sau.

The administrative post with 10,449 inhabitants (Census 2004) is divided in six Sucos: Ailili, Aiteas, Cribas, Iliheu, Ma'abat and Sau. The local dialect is Galoli though Tetum is widely known.

References

External links 

  – information page on Ministry of State Administration site 

Administrative posts of East Timor
Manatuto Municipality